State Route 560 (SR 560) is a  north–south state highway in the western portion of Ohio, a U.S. state.

Created in the late 1930s, SR 560 is a two-lane highway that runs through primarily rural terrain to the west and northwest of Urbana.

Route description
All of State Route 560 is situated within Champaign County.  No part of this state highway is inclusive within the National Highway System.

History
The first designation of SR 560 took place in 1937.  It was routed along the path that it currently maintains, and it has not experienced any major changes since its inception. The route had been fully paved by 1940.

Major intersections

References

560
Transportation in Champaign County, Ohio